Goin' Places is the twelfth studio album by the Jacksons. It would be the last Jacksons' album released as a joint venture between Epic Records and Philadelphia International Records. Goin' Places peaked at No. 63 on the Billboard 200 albums chart in the United States, and at No. 11 on the US Soul Albums chart. The album sold over half a million copies worldwide. A concert tour to promote the album, named the Goin' Places Tour, ran from January to May 1978.

Release
Goin' Places was released on October 18, 1977, on Epic Records. It was the group's 13th album, and would be the last Jacksons' album released as a joint venture between Epic Records and Philadelphia International Records. By 1978, the Jacksons would record primarily with Epic and would return to mainstream success with their next album, Destiny.

This is considered their lowest-selling album next to 2300 Jackson Street. The album peaked at No. 63 on the US Billboard 200, and at No. 11 on the US Soul albums chart. It sold over half a million copies worldwide.

Goin' Places  spawned the disco-hit "Different Kind of Lady" written by the group. The song gave the brothers the confidence to write and produce an entire album by themselves.

Music videos
In November 1977 the Jacksons released music videos to promote songs from the album.

The “Goin' Places” music video has the members of the band switching from a live performance to them traveling in many different ways. The video for "Even Though You're Gone" features the band members sitting (Michael separated from the rest of the group) singing the song. The video features the Jacksons wearing blue tuxedos.

Track listing
All tracks composed by Kenneth Gamble and Leon Huff; except where noted.

Side One
"Music's Takin' Over" (John Whitehead, Gene McFadden, Victor Carstarphen) – 4:26
"Goin' Places" (recorded December 1976) – 4:30
"Different Kind of Lady" (Jackie Jackson, Michael Jackson, Marlon Jackson, Randy Jackson, Tito Jackson) – 4:10
"Even Though You're Gone" – 4:31

Side Two
"Jump for Joy" (recorded December 1976 – 1977) (Dexter Wansel, Cynthia Biggs) – 4:42
"Heaven Knows I Love You, Girl" – 3:55
"Man of War"  – 3:13
"Do What You Wanna" (Jackie Jackson, Michael Jackson, Marlon Jackson, Randy Jackson, Tito Jackson) – 3:31
"Find Me a Girl"  – 4:34

Personnel
The Jacksons
Michael Jackson - lead and backing vocals
Tito Jackson - lead (tracks 6 & 7) and backing vocals, guitars
Marlon Jackson - lead (track 7) and backing vocals
Jackie Jackson - lead (track 7) and backing vocals
Randy Jackson - lead (track 7) and backing vocals, congas

Additional musicians
Charles Collins - drums
David Cruse, Larry Washington - bongos, congas 
Roland Chambers, Michael "Sugar Bear" Forman, Dennis Harris - guitars
Leon Huff, Dexter Wansel - keyboards, piano
Dexter Wansel, Jack Faith - arrangements

 Technical 
Leon Huff, Kenneth Gamble - executive producers
Jay Mark, Joe Tarsia - engineers
Ed Lee, John Berg - design
Reid Miles - photography

Charts

Album

Singles

References

External links
 The Jacksons – Goin' Places at Discogs

1977 albums
The Jackson 5 albums
Albums produced by Leon Huff
Albums produced by Kenneth Gamble
Philadelphia International Records albums
Albums recorded at Sigma Sound Studios
Epic Records albums
Albums with cover art by Reid Miles
Albums produced by Michael Jackson